Kamar Deraz (also Romanized as Kamar Derāz; also known as Boneh-ye Kord and Boneh-ye Kordī) is a village in Qaleh Tall Rural District, in the Central District of Bagh-e Malek County, Khuzestan Province, Iran. At the 2006 census, its population was 312, in 58 families.

References 

Populated places in Bagh-e Malek County